James Golden may refer to:

James S. Golden (1891–1971), American politician
James Golden (radio personality), a.k.a. Bo Snerdley, call screener and engineer for The Rush Limbaugh Show